Peter L. "Pete" Padgett (born June 15, 1954) is an American high school basketball coach. He is best known, however, for his playing career between 1972–73 and 1975–76 while on the Nevada Wolf Pack men's basketball team.

Playing career
Pete Padgett played for his father, Jim Padgett, the head coach at Nevada. Padgett was selected to the all-conference second team during his freshman year, then was subsequently picked as a first team all-conference member for his final three seasons. Padgett led the West Coast Athletic Conference in rebounding all four seasons and finished his career with 1,464 total, a sum good enough to place him in the top ten all-time in the NCAA's modern era.

Although rebounding was his specialty, Padgett finished his career with 1,642 points, which at the time was the third-highest in school history. He also set a conference-record by accumulating 784 assists (in conference games only). As a senior he was honored with the Doc Martie Award, given annually to the University of Nevada's top male athlete. Padgett was then chosen in the sixth round (88th overall) by the Atlanta Hawks in the 1976 NBA Draft, but he never played in the league.

Padgett was a two-sport star who also played baseball.

Coaching career
After college, Padgett stayed at school for one additional year to earn his master's degree in education administration. In 1977, he began his coaching career at Carson High School in Carson City, Nevada. He served as an assistant coach from 1977 to 1980, and then took over head coaching duties in 1980. For the next 15 years he guided the school's boys' basketball program before leaving to coach at Reno High School. Padgett spent five years at the school, and then prior to the 2000–01 NCAA Division I season he joined the staff at UC Santa Barbara. However, his time as an assistant coach at the college level was short-lived, and he resigned after one year to return to Reno High School where he still coaches today. In addition to serving as head coach, Padgett serves as the athletic director.

Personal
Padgett was born in San Jose, California, where his father Jim Padgett, an Oklahoma City native, was teaching and coaching at the time. Jim Padgett previously served in the United States Air Force during the Korean War, and later served as the head coach at Cal and Nevada. Pete Padgett's mother is Nancy Padgett, who was married to his late father for fifty-eight years. Pete and his wife, Debra A. Padgett, have one daughter, Melissa, and one son, David C. Padgett. David played basketball for Kansas and Louisville; he later went on to become an assistant at IUPUI and Louisville before being named interim head coach at Louisville in 2017 following revelations of the possible involvement of previous Louisville head coach Rick Pitino in a pay-for-play scandal.

See also
 List of NCAA Division I men's basketball career rebounding leaders

References

1954 births
Living people
Atlanta Hawks draft picks
Baseball players from Nevada
Basketball players from Nevada
High school basketball coaches in the United States
Nevada Wolf Pack baseball players
Nevada Wolf Pack men's basketball players
People from Carson City, Nevada
Sportspeople from Reno, Nevada
Power forwards (basketball)
Baseball players from Berkeley, California
Basketball players from Berkeley, California
Baseball players from San Jose, California
Basketball players from San Jose, California
UC Santa Barbara Gauchos men's basketball coaches
American men's basketball players